The 1877 Sligo County by-election was fought on 12 January 1877.  The byelection was fought due to the death of the incumbent Conservative MP, Sir Robert Gore-Booth.  It was won by the Conservative candidate Edward Robert King-Harman.

References

1877 elections in the United Kingdom
By-elections to the Parliament of the United Kingdom in County Sligo constituencies
Unopposed by-elections to the Parliament of the United Kingdom (need citation)
1877 elections in Ireland